Özsoy is a Turkish surname. Notable people with the surname include:

 Burcu Özsoy (born 1976), Turkish female antarctic scientist
 Fikret Özsoy, Turkish javelin thrower
 Hişyar Özsoy Turkish politician of Kurdish descent
 Neriman Özsoy, Turkish volleyball player
 Serkan Özsoy, Turkish footballer

Turkish-language surnames